The 2003 NCAA Division I Indoor Track and Field Championships were contested to determine the individual and team national champions of men's and women's NCAA collegiate indoor track and field events in the United States after the 2002–03 season, the 39th annual meet for men and 21st annual meet for women.

For the fourth consecutive year, the championships were held at the Randal Tyson Track Center at the University of Arkansas in Fayetteville, Arkansas.

Arkansas won the men's title, the Razorbacks' seventeenth and first since 2000.

Defending champions LSU won the women's title, the Lady Tigers' tenth.

Qualification
All teams and athletes from Division I indoor track and field programs were eligible to compete for this year's individual and team titles.

Team standings 
 Note: Top 10 only
 Scoring: 6 points for a 1st-place finish in an event, 4 points for 2nd, 3 points for 3rd, 2 points for 4th, and 1 point for 5th
 (DC) = Defending Champions
 † = Participation vacated by NCAA Committee on Infractions

Men's title
 53 teams scored at least one point

Women's title
 54 teams scored at least one point

See also
2002 NCAA Division I Cross Country Championships
2003 NCAA Division I Outdoor Track and Field Championships

References

NCAA Indoor Track and Field Championships
Ncaa Indoor Track And Field Championships
Ncaa Indoor Track And Field Championships